Jackson Kasanga Mulwa (1942 – 16 March 2015) was a Kenyan judge and politician.

Mulwa was a judge on the East African Court of Justice, as well as a Member of Parliament representing Makueni Constituency from 1969 to 1983.

References

2015 deaths
East African Court of Justice judges
Kenyan judges
Members of the National Assembly (Kenya)
1942 births
Kenyan judges of international courts and tribunals